Muhammad Izreen bin Izwandy (born 16 July 2000) is a Malaysian footballer who plays as a midfielder for Kuala Lumpur City.

Career statistics

Club

Honour

Club
KL City FC
 Malaysia Cup: 2021

References

External links
 

2000 births
Living people
People from Penang
Kuala Lumpur City F.C. players
Malaysian footballers
Association football midfielders
Malaysia Super League players